Yeasin Khan is a Bangladeshi footballer who plays as a defender for Sheikh Russel KC and the Bangladesh national football team.

International goals 
Scores and results list Bangladesh's goal tally first.

References 

1994 births
Living people
Bangladeshi footballers
Bangladesh international footballers
Sheikh Russel KC players
Sheikh Jamal Dhanmondi Club players
Association football defenders
Footballers at the 2014 Asian Games
Asian Games competitors for Bangladesh
Bashundhara Kings players
Bangladesh Football Premier League players